The President's "E" Award - for Exporter - is an award presented by the United States Department of Commerce "to persons, firms, and organizations engaged in the marketing of products who make significant contributions to the expansion of the export trade of the United States." It was established by Executive Order 10978 on December 5, 1961. All "E" Award winners receive a certificate signed in the name and by the authority of the President by Secretary of Commerce, a lapel pin, and a white pennant with a large blue "E" on it to fly over their plant or office.

See also
Awards and decorations of the United States government

External links
Official US government page
Text of Executive Order 10978

American awards
United States Department of Commerce
Awards and decorations of the United States Department of Commerce